Melinninae are a subfamily of the Ampharetidae, belonging to the Terebellida (bristle worms).

The Mellinninae are described firstly by Ralph V. Chamberlin in The Annelida Polychaeta, 1919.

On page 443 he states: " One or two stout dorsal spines caudad of the branchiae on each side; number of somites large, near seventy or more Melinninae", suggesting that there are more than 70 genera in this subfamily. The WoRMS currently lists eleven direct children of the subfamily.

References

External links 
 Laetitia M. Gunton et al.: Two New Deep-water Species of Ampharetidae (Annelida: Polychaeta) from the Eastern Australian Continental Margin. Records of the Australian Museum 72 (4): pp. 101–121; 12 August 2020; doi:10.3853/j.2201-4349.72.2020.1763
 Natali Andersen: Two New Species of Deep-Sea Worms Discovered, on: sci-news.com, Aug 26, 2020

Terebellida
Taxonomy (biology)